UFC Fight Night: Muñoz vs. Mousasi (also known as UFC Fight Night 41) was a mixed martial arts event held on May 31, 2014, at O2 World in Berlin, Germany.

Background
The event was the first that the organization had hosted in Berlin, and third in Germany following UFC 99 and UFC 122 in 2009 and 2010.

The event was the first of two that took place on May 31, 2014, with The Ultimate Fighter Brazil 3 Finale: Miocic vs. Maldonado being the other making it only the second time in UFC history that they have hosted two events in one day.

The card was headlined by a middleweight bout between Gegard Mousasi and Mark Muñoz.

Thiago Tavares was expected to face Tom Niinimäki at the event.  However, Tavares pulled out of the bout citing an injured thigh and was replaced by promotional newcomer Niklas Bäckström.

The octagon's canvas was exceptionally lacking sponsor logos, due to the Berlin event's canvas having been unintentionally shipped to São Paulo's event.

Results

Bonus awards
The following fighters were awarded $50,000 bonuses:
Fight of the Night: None awarded
 Performance of the Night: Magnus Cedenblad, Niklas Bäckström, C.B. Dollaway and Gegard Mousasi

See also
List of UFC events
2014 in UFC

References

UFC Fight Night
Events in Berlin
Mixed martial arts in Germany
Sports competitions in Berlin
2014 in German sport
2014 in mixed martial arts